Lake Kahuparere is a lake in the Northland Region of New Zealand.

See also
List of lakes in New Zealand

References
Land Information New Zealand - Search for Place Names

Kahuparere
Kaipara District